Delta-Differential One-Way Ranging (or Delta-DOR, Δ-DOR for short) is an interplanetary radio-tracking and navigation technique.

How it is done
Radio signals from the spacecraft are received by two widely separated deep-space ground stations on Earth and the difference in the times of signal arrival is precisely measured (and used to calculate a bearing). This is corrected using information about the current delays due to Earth's atmosphere, obtained by simultaneously tracking (from each ground location) radio signals from a quasar (within 10 degrees of the same direction).

NASA uses its Deep Space Network to pick up signals from the spacecraft that tell navigators where the spacecraft are located. 
This navigation service is called "tracking coverage" and it includes Doppler, ranging and delta differential one-way ranging, or "Delta DOR."

ESA has the ESA Deep Space Network, China has the Chinese Deep Space Network and India has the Indian Deep Space Network.

Missions that used it
Δ-DOR navigation has been used by number of NASA planetary missions. Other space agencies have also used the technique, on missions such as:

ESA used a Δ-DOR system for Venus Express' orbit insertion in April 2006 and to Rosetta's Mars swingby in February 2007.

CNSA is using Δ-DOR technique for Chang'e series lunar spacecraft tracking

ISRO is using Δ-DOR for the Mars Orbiter Mission (MOM).

ESA is using Δ-DOR for the ExoMars Trace Gas Orbiter (TGO).

References

External links
 Deep Space Network (DSN)
 ESA Deep Space Network (Estrack)
 Indian Deep Space Network (IDSN) 

Spaceflight technology